In the 2007 season, Shelbourne finished 5th in the League of Ireland First Division.

Overview 
Following the financial crisis of 2006, at the start of the 2007 season, the club was left with just two senior players by January, and the club's financial crisis resulted in the club pulling out of the Setanta Cup. The crisis even began to threaten their participation in the Champions' League for 2007. Shelbourne's woes were deepened on 25 January 2007 when owner and general manager, Ollie Byrne, was taken to hospital with a reported brain tumour, most likely, stress-induced.

Shelbourne, with no manager and just one remaining senior player by February were said to be massively in debt – some reports putting it at €6 million, and others between even €10 million and €12 million. The fiasco only served to increase the pressures on the FAI, who already had to find two new replacement clubs to participate in the league following the extinction of Dublin City F.C. and Limerick F.C. in 2006. The association decided to set up a review of the awarding of a Premier Division licence to the club and eventually decided that the club should be stripped of the chance to compete in the Premier Division. Shelbourne had their Premier licence revoked and were, instead, considered lucky to be placed in the First Division for the 2007 season. There had been worries that the club would face outright extinction and that the FAI would throw the club out of the league altogether, especially after Limerick, who had less severe problems than Shelbourne, were denied a First Division licence. Liam Moggan, the chairman of the FAI's Licensing Committee resigned in protest after the decision was made to grant Shelbourne a First Division licence as he believed that the club - manager-less, player-less and heavily in the red - did not meet the criteria for the awarding of such a licence, even though its criteria were less strict than those required to pass for a Premier licence. It is probable that the Committee as a whole took an extremely sympathetic view while taking into account the long history of the club and, facing a minimal time-frame for exploring alternatives before the kick-off in March, logistical factors, such as ensuring that the league began with the preferred number of teams, when coming to a final decision to keep Shelbourne in the league.

However, the FAI did not specifically announce whether their decision was punishment for continuing off-the-field abuses from 2006, such as failing to pay players their wages, or whether it was a repercussion of Shelbourne failing to meet the requisite criteria for partaking in the 2007 Premier Division (although it is likely that the course of action taken was due to the latter as if it were a punishment for the 2006 season a deduction in points from that season's tally would be the usual penalty, which would have led to the club being stripped of their title in this scenario). If the relegation was indeed due to a failure to meet standards for 2007, the club's off-the-field abuses during 2006 remain to be seen as having been permissible for that season.

Meanwhile, Waterford United were invited to take Shelbourne's place in the Premier Division for 2007 as they were the next best-placed First Division club in the Independent Assessment Group's rankings. Waterford United accepted the invitation, while the task of sourcing funds, a manager and squad before the transfer-deadline of 28 February remained at the forefront of the club's worries by mid-February. On 23 February, Shelbourne announced that Dermot Keely had been appointed as their new manager. The signing of a new squad of players commenced immediately afterward - quite a few of these players being youngsters and loaned players from other clubs, although the club did also manage to entice a number of ripened seniors to Tolka Park for the 2007 season.

Club

Club information

Commercial partners

Coaching and Medical staff

Pre-season

Exodus 
This is the squad that completed the 2006 season, winning the Premier Division in the process.

 (c)

The following players were registered to Shelbourne, but had been sent out on loan by the then manager Pat Fenlon.

Following the ongoing financial problems during the 2006 season, Pat Fenlon resigned and the vast majority of players left. Several of them had reached the end of their contracts, whilst some were sold shortly after the celebrations in November, and others left after being declared free agents in the courts following missed payment of wages. Only 2 senior players remained with the club, the experienced Jim Crawford, and the young James Chambers who had spent 2006 on loan at Premier Division side Waterford United.

Withdrawal from the Setanta Cup 
In February Shelbourne were forced to withdraw from the 2007 Setanta Sports Cup shortly before it was due to commence. The general assumption was that the club would be unable to field a team. St. Patrick's Athletic were invited to fill the vacancy, and they duly accepted.

Demotion 
Before the start of the new league season, the club were demoted to the First Division by the FAI.

The FAI issued a First Division licence in place of the Premier Division licence which had been revoked by order of the FAI's First Instance Committee due to the financial situation. Shortly after this, the club's majority shareholder Ollie Byrne suffered a brain tumour and Joe Casey was installed as Chairman.

Former manager Dermot Keely was brought in as manager once more and assembled a squad of players in barely 72 hours - just in time for the club to take its place in the 2007 First Division.

Withdrawal from Champions League 
On 30 March 2007, when applications for UEFA licences were nearly due and the clubs' First Division licence was up for review, Shelbourne announced that they would not be applying for a UEFA licence; thus relinquishing the Champions League spot that was rewarded for winning the league in 2006. Part of the statement read:

League runners-up Derry City were handed the Champions League place.

Players 

Jim Crawford and James Chambers were the only existing senior players to stay with the club for the 2007 season. Jim was appointed captain by Keely. Goalkeeper Tony O'Dowd signed for Shelbourne, returning to the club with whom he had started his footballing career. Experienced defender Alan Murphy was signed from Longford Town and was appointed vice-captain, whilst a plethora of young players arrived from a host of clubs.

Mark Leech signed on a season-long loan from Premier Division club Drogheda United, and new Derry City arrival Kyle Moran did the same.

Four players arrived at Shelbourne from Dublin rivals Bohemians; Conor Rafferty and 2006's top scorer for the First Division Davitt Walsh signed on loan deals until the end of July, defenders Aidan Collins and Niall O'Reilly made their moves to Tolka Park permanent.

FIFA Regulations: Article 5.3 
Two of Shelbourne's new players, Mark Leech and John Brophy, who had already played with two clubs within the year prior to the season's kick-off, were left ineligible to play for the club in competitive action until July at the beginning of the season as FIFA's rules, or, in particular, Article 5.3 of FIFA’s Regulations for the Status and Transfer of Players, stated that no player could play for more than two different clubs between 1 July of one season and 30 June of the following year.

Both players were eventually cleared by FIFA, and made their competitive debuts in a 1-1 draw with Kilkenny City at Buckley Park on 30 March 2007.

2007 squad 
A total of 37 players represented Shelbourne at various stages during the 2007 season.

 (Vice-captain)

 (Captain)

Results

League of Ireland First Division

Final table

League results summary

League Form/Results by Round

FAI Ford Cup 
The draw for the FAI Ford Cup took place on 31 May 2007. Shels, like all League sides, automatically went into the second round.

League of Ireland Cup 

Shelbourne began the League of Ireland Cup in the Second Round, as the club was officially classed as European entrants when the draws were made. Shelbourne were drawn against Dublin rivals Bohemians, who had begun the 2007 season in the top flight with two of last year's championship winning Shelbourne team, Owen Heary and Glen Crowe. Despite a valiant effort from the young Shelbourne team, the difference in quality eventually told, with Bohemians qualifying for the next round due to 2 late goals from the man who had scored the goal that won Shelbourne the league just a few short months previous, Glen Crowe.

Friendlies

Season overview 

Shelbourne's 2007 season in the First Division began brightly with a dogged display against Kildare County at Tolka Park less than 2 weeks after their squad was assembled. Darren McKenna's dramatic late equaliser in that game secured a point for Shels giving the Tolka Park side much optimism for the season ahead.

Shels next two games against the much fancied promotion favourites Finn Harps and Dundalk brought the young Shels side back to earth with two defeats, including conceding a last minute equaliser to Harps.

After a frustrating 1-1 draw against 10 man Kilkenny City at Buckley Park, Shels first victory of the season arrived 5 games in against Athlone Town at Tolka Park courtesy of a Mark Leech header. Shels' generally young and inexperienced side failed to build on their first victory and would draw 4 of their next 5 games, their loss during this five game period came courtesy of conceding another last minute goal this time away to Cobh Ramblers. With injuries to notable players such as Jim Crawford and Aidan Collins, Shels' strength in depth would face a stern test during this period.

A heavy 3-0 away defeat to Dundalk in May was countered by an encouraging 2-0 victory at home to Kilkenny City but that game was marred after John Brophy suffered a broken leg after a heavy challenge ruling him out of action for 4 months.

Shels inconsistent start to the season was capped with a 1-0 defeat away to Athlone Town leaving Shels far too close to the foot of the First Division table for their liking. Injuries and player departures would take their toll on Shels during June and Shels suffered their heaviest defeat of the season during this period with a 4-0 defeat away to Monaghan United. Despite encouraging displays against Cobh Ramblers (2-2 draw) and another late defeat this time to Limerick 37 (3-2) would not be not enough to prevent numerous changes during the upcoming July transfer window.

Shelbourne made significant changes at the start of the July transfer window. A total of 11 players joined Shels during the month of July including Stuart Malcolm, Marc McCulloch, Alan Keely, Anto Flood and Mark Rooney while
Mark O'Brien and Noel Haverty joined Shels on loan from rivals Bohemians and St. Patrick's Athletic respectively.

The impact of Shels newly assembled squad was felt immediately with a 1-0 victory over Wexford Youths at Tolka Park, only Shels 3rd win of the season. After a 1-0 away defeat to Finn Harps, Shels revitalised themselves with 3 consecutive victories against Dundalk, Kilkenny City and Athlone Town. July's turnaround in Shelbourne's form gave Shels optimism for securing the 3rd place play-off spot.

Shels hopes of securing 3rd place were dashed over one weekend at Tolka Park with a 1-1 draw against Monaghan United and a defeat by Finn Harps with yet another last minute goal conceded.

Shelbourne Football Club was in mourning during August after the death of Chief Executive Ollie Byrne. The first match after Byrne's death came against Limerick 37 at Tolka Park. In what was an emotional night at Tolka Park, Shelbourne provided one of their most impressive displays of the season with a comprehensive 4-0 victory.

Two more victories over Wexford Youths and Kildare County gave Shels much optimism over finishing in 4th place but these ambitions were hit after another defeat to Finn Harps with yet another last minute conceded goal, the third time Shelbourne conceded a last minute winner to Harps this season.

With no promotion prospects during the remainder of the season, Shelbourne's form slipped dramatically during the season run in. Despite a comfortable 4-1 win away to Athlone Town, Shels struggled during this period with a defeat to Dundalk and a disappointing home draw to lowly Kilkenny City.

Shelbourne's finish to the season was one they would rather forget. 4 defeats in their final 4 matches marked a considerable decline in the Shels form after a new lease of life during the months of July and August.

After what was a truly difficult season both on and off the pitch, Shelbourne finished 5th in the First Division table and Mark Leech finished the club's top goalscorer with 12 league goals.

2007 season statistics

Player appearances/goals 

As of 10 November 2007.

|}

Top goalscorers

Notes

References 

Shelbourne F.C. seasons
Shelbourne
Shelbourne